Kim Weston (born December 20, 1939) is an American soul singer, and Motown alumna. In the 1960s, Weston scored hits with the songs "Love Me All the Way" and "Take Me in Your Arms (Rock Me a Little While)", and with her duet with Marvin Gaye, "It Takes Two".

Career
Born Agatha Nathalia Weston in Detroit, Michigan, United States, she was signed to Motown in 1961, scoring a minor hit with "Love Me All the Way" (R&B No. 24, Pop #88). Weston's biggest solo hits with Motown were "Take Me in Your Arms (Rock Me a Little While)" (R&B No. 4, Pop No. 50, 1965, later covered by the Isley Brothers, Blood, Sweat & Tears, Jermaine Jackson , the Doobie Brothers and Phil Collins), and "Helpless" (R&B No. 13, Pop No. 56, entered Cashbox March 26, 1966, previously recorded by The Four Tops on their Second Album LP). Her biggest claim to fame was singing the classic hit "It Takes Two" with Marvin Gaye in 1966, and her later recording of the Black National Anthem, "Lift Every Voice and Sing". It was the success of "It Takes Two" that caused Motown to partner Gaye with Tammi Terrell, spawning even more success for the label.

Weston left Motown in 1967, and later sued the label over disputes about royalties. She and her then-husband William "Mickey" Stevenson (former A&R head at Motown) both went to MGM Records. Weston cut a couple of singles for MGM, "I Got What You Need," and "Nobody," which went largely unnoticed due to lack of airplay and promotion. She made an album for the label, This Is America, which included her popular version of the Black National Anthem, "Lift Every Voice and Sing". This was released as a single and featured in the movie, Wattstax. All the money from the single was donated to the United Negro College Fund.

She recorded several more albums for various labels, Stax/Volt among them, and also made an album of duets with Johnny Nash. None of these recordings charted, and Weston reportedly relocated to Israel, where she worked with young singers.

Weston made a guest appearance on The Bill Cosby Show (1969–1971), in episode No. 50 in March 1971.

Along with many former Motown artists, she signed with Ian Levine's Motorcity Records in the 1980s, releasing the single "Signal Your Intention", which peaked at No. 1 in the UK Hi-NRG chart. It was followed by the album Investigate (1990), which included some re-recordings of her Motown hits as well as new material. A second album for the label, Talking Loud (1992), was never released, although all the songs were included on the compilation The Best Of Kim Weston (1996).

Kim Weston was inducted into the inaugural class of the Official Rhythm & Blues Music Hall of Fame at Cleveland State University in August 2013.

Discography
Studio albums
1966: Take Two (duet album with Marvin Gaye) (Tamla T 270)
1966: Take Me in Your Arms (Motown) (shelved)
1966: For the First Time (MGM SE-4477)
1968: This Is America (MGM SE-4561)
1969: Johnny Nash & Kim Weston (duet album with Johnny Nash) (Major Minor SMLP 54)
1970: Big Brass Four Poster (People PLP-5001)
1970: Kim Kim Kim (Volt VOS 6014)
1990: Investigate (Motorcity MOTCLP29)
1991: Talking Loud (Motorcity Records) (shelved)

Compilations
1991: Greatest Hits & Rare Classics
1996: The Very Best of the Motorcity Recordings
2003: 20th Century Masters – The Millennium Collection: The Best of Kim Weston
2005: Motown Anthology

Live releases
2020: Live in Detroit 1978

Chart singles

Further reading
 Kim Weston interview by Pete Lewis, 'Blues & Soul' October 2008
 Whitall, Susan. For the Record: Women of Motown (1998)
 Chafets, Ze'ev, "Devil's Night: And Other True Tales of Detroit" (Random House, 1990)

References

External links
 
 

1939 births
Living people
20th-century African-American women singers
American soul musicians
American mezzo-sopranos
Motown artists
MGM Records artists
Northern soul musicians
Stax Records artists
Singers from Detroit
21st-century African-American people
21st-century African-American women